St Andrews International School Bangkok is a British International School founded in 1997 that provides a British-style education and curriculum to children ranging from Foundation Stage 1 (2 years old) to High School (18 years old). St Andrews is a Nord Anglia Education operated school and part of a network of 78 schools that spans across 31 countries. St Andrews has over 2000 students representing an international community of 50+ nationalities. St Andrews is an inclusive school that welcomes students of all abilities to be ambitious and learn in a diverse and safe environment.

The school is located across two campuses in close proximity on Sukhumvit Road in Phra Khanong District and Watthana District. St Andrews Primary School is located on Sukhumvit 71 Soi 20/1, accessible from On Nut and Phra Khanong BTS stations. St Andrews High School is located on 1020 Sukhumvit Rd, close to Ekkamai Gateway shopping mall, Ekkamai and Phra Khanong BTS stations.

History
Established in 1997, St Andrews International School, Primary and High School were previously located on the same campus on Sukhumvit Soi 71. In August 2017, St Andrews International School expanded and redeveloped a nearby private bilingual Thai school into a new purpose-built High School campus on Sukhumvit Road. 

In 2020, St Andrews International School, Primary School was awarded the ISC 2020 International School of the Year and for the Best Environmental initiative of 2020 with the ‘Eco Beasts’.

Student profile

 2000+ Students: (900+ Primary, 1100+ Secondary)

 Nationalities: 50:50 International and Thai Students. 50+ Nationalities  
 Student to Teacher Ratio: Foundation Stage 6:1 KS1 / KS2 - 10:1, High School - 14:1 
 Average class size: Nursery/Kindergarten 15 students, KS1/KS2 - 20 students, High School 16 Students

Curriculum

English National Curriculum 
St Andrews Primary and High School follow the English National Curriculum with modifications to incorporate aspects of the international community.

St Andrews organises its students into Key Stages; Foundation, KS1, KS2, KS3, KS4, KS5 and KS6. In KS5 and KS6, St Andrews offers recognised qualifications including the International General Certificate of Secondary Education (IGCSE) and International Baccalaureate (IB) Diploma Program (DP). The IB program provides students with well-respected and widely recognised qualifications for entry into higher education and universities worldwide.

Languages 
The language of instruction at St Andrews International School Bangkok is English. Languages taught include Thai, French, Spanish, German, Korean, Mandarin, Japanese. 

The First Language Program is for French, German, Japanese and Korean students. It is an additional program that supports students who are native speakers or have equivalent language proficiency with the necessary language skills and cultural understanding to integrate back into their national educational systems upon returning home.

Learning support 
St Andrews has an inclusive educational policy with non-selective admissions, welcoming students of all abilities. Learning support to students is delivered in-class in small groups as well as individually outside the classroom. Individual Education Plans (IEP) are designed for learning support students and used by teachers to adapt the classroom learning environment to meet all individuals learning needs and goals.

Accreditation and affiliations 
St Andrews has full international accreditation by the Education Development Trust (EDT). The Education Development Trust is a UK based institution that provides accreditation, INSET and educational programs to schools in the UK and abroad. 

BSO Inspection Reports indicated that St Andrews quality of education standards were outstanding across the Primary and High School. This standard was validated by the International School Quality Mark (ISQM).

St Andrews International School is a recognised International Baccalaureate IB World School and provides the programme to Year 12 and 13. St Andrews is an accredited examination centre. For Edexcel IGCSE, University of Cambridge IGCSE and the College Board SAT.  

St Andrews has affiliations with the below organisations:

 Centre for British Teaching Education Trust(CfBT)
 British Schools Overseas (BSO)
 International Baccalaureate Organisation (IBO)
 Office for National Education Standards and Quality Assessment (ONESQA)
 International Schools Association of Thailand (ISAT)
 Council of International Schools (COIS) 

 The Federation of British International Schools in Asia (FOBISIA)

Notable alumni 

 Nidhish Sachdeva (Athlete, Musician)
 Gabriel Watkins (Singer-Songwriter)
 Taisei Inoue (Atomic Bomb)

References

External links
 St. Andrews International School Bangkok website
 International Schools Association of Thailand
 Cambridge IGCSE

Schools in Bangkok
International Baccalaureate schools in Thailand
Educational institutions established in 1997
1997 establishments in Thailand
Nord Anglia Education